Seven Regional or 7 Regional may refer to:

Prime7, now 7 Regional
Seven (Southern Cross Austereo), sometimes called Seven Regional
GWN7, now Seven Regional WA

See also
Network seven (disambiguation)